Aleksandar Bursać (born 19 March 1995) is a Serbian professional basketball player for MZT Skopje of the ABA League.

Professional career 
In July 2020, Bursać signed for the Croatian team Zadar. On 1 July 2021, he signed a one-year contract extension with Zadar. In November 2022, he signed for MZT Skopje.

References

External links
 Eurobasket profile
 FIBA profile
 Realgm profile
 Euroleague Profile
 aba-liga Profile
 BGBasket Profile

1995 births
Living people
ABA League players
Basketball League of Serbia players
Bàsquet Girona players
KK FMP players
KK Vršac players
KK Vojvodina players
KK Vojvodina Srbijagas players
KK Zadar players
Liga ACB players
Serbian expatriate basketball people in Croatia
Serbian expatriate basketball people in Spain
Serbian men's basketball players
People from Ruma
Power forwards (basketball)